Police Officers Club Stadium, or Dubai Municipal Stadium, is a multi-use stadium in Dubai, United Arab Emirates. The stadium holds 7,500 people, and is used mostly for football matches.

External links

 Stadium pictures

References

Football venues in the United Arab Emirates
Buildings and structures in Dubai
Sports venues in Dubai